Research Institute for Islamic Culture and Thought is an Iranian Research institute whose main purpose is theorizing on religious thought and enhancing the epistemological bases of the Islamic Revolution. The institute has departments of philosophy, mysticism, and ethics, as well as Western Studies and Islamic economy among others.

History
The Institute was established in 1994 with the confirmation of Iranian Supreme Leader in response to the proponents of Western philosophical schools and religious intellectualism. IICT was created by suggestion of Ali Akbar Rashad, a member of the Supreme Council of the Cultural Revolution, who became the head of the Institute.

Notable faculty

Journals
Qabasat
Zehn (Mind) 
Eghtesad-e Eslami (Islamic Economics)
Hoquq-e Eslami (Islamic Law)

References

External links
 Official Website

Humanities institutes
1994 establishments in Iran
Research institutes established in 1994
Research institutes in Iran
Islamic organisations based in Iran
Research Institute for Islamic Culture and Thought